This article lists all-time records achieved in the NBA regular season in major statistical categories recognized by the league, including those set by teams and individuals in a game, season, and career. The NBA also recognizes records from its original incarnation, the Basketball Association of America (BAA).

Individual game records
 Most minutes and seconds played in a game
 69:00 by Dale Ellis, Seattle SuperSonics (at Milwaukee Bucks) on November 9,  (5 OT)
 Quickest to reach a triple-double
 14 minutes and 33 seconds by Nikola Jokić, Denver Nuggets (at Milwaukee Bucks) on February 15, .

Points
Most points in a game
 100 by Wilt Chamberlain, Philadelphia Warriors (vs. New York Knicks) on March 2, 
Most points in a half
 59 by Wilt Chamberlain, Philadelphia Warriors (vs. New York Knicks) on March 2,  (2nd)
 Most points in a quarter
 37 by Klay Thompson, Golden State Warriors (vs. Sacramento Kings) on January 23,  (3rd)
 Most points in an overtime period
 16 by Gilbert Arenas, Washington Wizards (vs. Los Angeles Lakers) on December 17, 
Note: the post-season record is 17 by Stephen Curry
 Most points in a triple-double
 60 by James Harden, Houston Rockets (vs. Orlando Magic) on January 30, 
 60 by Luka Doncic, Dallas Mavericks vs. New York Knicks on December 27, 2022.

Field goals
 Most field goals made in a game
 36 by Wilt Chamberlain, Philadelphia Warriors (vs. New York Knicks) on March 2, 
 Most field goals attempted in a game
 63 by Wilt Chamberlain, Philadelphia Warriors (vs. New York Knicks) on March 2, 
 Most field goals missed in a game
 42 by Joe Fulks, Philadelphia Warriors (vs. Providence Steamrollers) on March 18,  (13/55)
 Most field goals made in a half
 22 by Wilt Chamberlain, Philadelphia Warriors (vs. New York Knicks) on March 2,  (2nd)
 Most field goals attempted in a half
 37 by Wilt Chamberlain, Philadelphia Warriors (vs. New York Knicks) on March 2,  (2nd)
 Most field goals made in a quarter
 13 by David Thompson, Denver Nuggets (vs. Detroit Pistons) on April 9,  (1st)
 13 by Klay Thompson, Golden State Warriors (vs. Sacramento Kings) on January 23,  (3rd)
 Most field goals attempted in a quarter
 21 by Wilt Chamberlain, Philadelphia Warriors (vs. New York Knicks) on March 2,  (4th)
 Most field goals made in a game, no misses
 18 by Wilt Chamberlain, Philadelphia 76ers (vs. Baltimore Bullets) on February 24, 
 Most field goals attempted in a game, none made
 17 by Tim Hardaway, Golden State Warriors (at Minnesota Timberwolves) on December 27, 
 Most 2-point field goals made in a game
 36 by Wilt Chamberlain, Philadelphia Warriors (vs. New York Knicks) on March 2, 
 Most 2-point field goals attempted in a game
 63 by Wilt Chamberlain, Philadelphia Warriors (vs. New York Knicks) on March 2, 
 Most 2-point field goals missed in a game
 42 by Joe Fulks, Philadelphia Warriors (vs. Providence Steamrollers) on March 18,  (13/55)
 Most 3-point field goals made in a game
 14 by Klay Thompson, Golden State Warriors (at Chicago Bulls) on October 29,  (14/24)
 Most 3-point field goals attempted in a game
 24 by Klay Thompson, Golden State Warriors (at Chicago Bulls) on October 29,  (14/24)
 Most 3-point field goals missed in a game
 16 by Damon Stoudamire, Portland Trail Blazers (at Golden State Warriors) on April 15,  (5/21)
 16 by James Harden, Houston Rockets (at Orlando Magic) on January 13,  (1/17)
 16 by James Harden, Houston Rockets (vs. Sacramento Kings) on March 30,  (7/23)
 16 by James Harden, Houston Rockets (vs. New Orleans Pelicans) on October 26,  (2/18)
 16 by James Harden, Houston Rockets (at San Antonio Spurs) on December 3,  (4/20)
 16 by James Harden, Houston Rockets (at Atlanta Hawks) on January 8,  (4/20)
 16 by James Harden, Houston Rockets (vs. Oklahoma City Thunder) on January 20,  (1/17)
 Most 3-point field goals made in a game, no misses
 9 by Latrell Sprewell, New York Knicks (vs. Los Angeles Clippers) on February 4, 
 9 by Ben Gordon, Chicago Bulls (vs. Washington Wizards) on April 14, 
 9 by Ben Gordon, Detroit Pistons (at Denver Nuggets) on March 21, 
 Most consecutive 3-point field goals made to start a game
 10 by Ty Lawson, Denver Nuggets (vs. Minnesota Timberwolves) on April 9,  (10/11)
 10 by Klay Thompson, Golden State Warriors (at Los Angeles Lakers) on January 21,  (10/11)
 Most 3-point field goals attempted in a game, none made
 12 by Brook Lopez, Milwaukee Bucks (vs. Phoenix Suns) on November 23, 
 Most 3-point field goals made in a half
 10 by Chandler Parsons, Houston Rockets (vs. Memphis Grizzlies) on January 24,  (10/11)
 10 by Klay Thompson, Golden State Warriors (at Chicago Bulls) on October 29,  (10/14)
 Most 3-point field goals made in a quarter
 9 by Klay Thompson, Golden State Warriors (vs. Sacramento Kings) on January 23,  (9/9)
 Most 3-point field goals attempted in a quarter, no misses
 9 by Klay Thompson, Golden State Warriors (vs. Sacramento Kings) on January 23,  (9/9)

Free throws
 Most free throws made in a game
 28 by Wilt Chamberlain, Philadelphia Warriors (vs. New York Knicks) on March 2,  (28/32)
 28 by Adrian Dantley, Utah Jazz (vs. Houston Rockets) on January 4,  (28/29)
Note: the post-season record is 30 by Bob Cousy
 Most free throws made in a game, no misses
 24 by James Harden, Houston Rockets (vs. San Antonio Spurs) on December 3, 2019
 Most free throws attempted in a game, none made
 11 by Shaquille O'Neal, Los Angeles Lakers (vs. Seattle SuperSonics) on December 8, 
 Most free throws attempted in a game 39 by Dwight Howard, Orlando Magic (vs. Golden State Warriors) on January 12,  (21/39)
 39 by Dwight Howard, Los Angeles Lakers (at Orlando Magic) on March 12,  (25/39)
 Most free throws missed in a game 23 by Andre Drummond, Detroit Pistons (at Houston Rockets) on January 20,  (13/36)
 Most free throws made in a half 20 by Michael Jordan, Chicago Bulls (vs. Miami Heat) on December 30, 
 20 by Devin Booker, Phoenix Suns (vs. Boston Celtics) on March 24, 
 Most free throws attempted in a half 28 by Andre Drummond, Detroit Pistons (vs. Houston Rockets) on January 20,  (11/28)
 Most free throws made in a quarter 18 by Anthony Davis, Los Angeles Lakers (vs Memphis Grizzlies) on October 29, 
 Most free throws attempted in a quarter 24 by Ben Simmons, Philadelphia 76ers (vs Washington Wizards) on November 29, 

ReboundsMost rebounds in a game 55 by Wilt Chamberlain, Philadelphia Warriors (vs. Boston Celtics) on November 24, 
 Most rebounds in a half 32 by Bill Russell, Boston Celtics (vs. Philadelphia Warriors) on November 16, 
 Most rebounds in a quarter 18 by Nate Thurmond, San Francisco Warriors (at Baltimore Bullets) on February 28, 
Note: the post-season record is 19 by Bill Russell

AssistsMost assists in a game 30 by Scott Skiles, Orlando Magic (vs. Denver Nuggets) on December 30, 
 Most assists in a half 19 by Bob Cousy, Boston Celtics (vs. Minneapolis Lakers) on February 27, 
 Most assists in a quarter 14 by John Lucas, San Antonio Spurs (vs. Denver Nuggets) on April 15, 
 14 by Steve Blake, Portland Trail Blazers (vs. Los Angeles Clippers) on February 22, 

StealsMost steals in a game 11 by Larry Kenon, San Antonio Spurs (at Kansas City Kings) on December 26, 
 11 by Kendall Gill, New Jersey Nets (vs. Miami Heat) on April 3, 
 Most steals in a half 9 by T. J. McConnell, Indiana Pacers (vs. Cleveland Cavaliers) on March 3, 
 Most steals in a quarter 8 by Fat Lever, Denver Nuggets (vs. Indiana Pacers) on March 9, 

BlocksMost blocks in a game 17 by Elmore Smith, Los Angeles Lakers (vs. Portland Trail Blazers) on October 28, 
 Most blocks in a half 11 by Elmore Smith, Los Angeles Lakers (vs. Portland Trail Blazers) on October 28, 
 11 by George T. Johnson, San Antonio Spurs (vs. Golden State Warriors) on February 24, 
 11 by Manute Bol, Washington Bullets (vs. Milwaukee Bucks) on December 12, 
 Most blocks in a quarter 8 by Manute Bol, Washington Bullets (vs. Milwaukee Bucks) on December 12, 
 8 by Manute Bol, Washington Bullets (vs. Indiana Pacers) on February 26, 
 8 by Dikembe Mutombo, Philadelphia 76ers (at Chicago Bulls) on December 1, 
 8 by Erick Dampier, Golden State Warriors (vs. Los Angeles Clippers) on April 17, 

Turnovers
 Most turnovers in a game 14 by John Drew, Atlanta Hawks (at New Jersey Nets) on March 1, 
 14 by Jason Kidd, Phoenix Suns (vs. New York Knicks) on November 17, 

Individual season records
 Most games played 88 by Walt Bellamy, 
 Most minutes played 3,882 by Wilt Chamberlain, 
 Most minutes per game average 48.52 by Wilt Chamberlain, 
 Most consecutive triple-doubles 11 by Russell Westbrook, 

Points
 Highest points per game average 50.36 by Wilt Chamberlain, 
 Most points 4,029 by Wilt Chamberlain, 
 Most 50-point games 45 by Wilt Chamberlain, 
 Most 40-point games 63 by Wilt Chamberlain, 
 Most consecutive 50+ point games 7 by Wilt Chamberlain from December 16 – 29, 
 Most consecutive 40+ point games 14 by Wilt Chamberlain from December 8 – 30,  and January 11 – February 1, 
 Most consecutive 30+ point games 65 by Wilt Chamberlain from November 4,  – February 22, 

Field goals
 Most field goals made 1,597 by Wilt Chamberlain, 
 Highest field goal percentage 74.19% by Mitchell Robinson, 
 Most field goals attempted 3,159 by Wilt Chamberlain, 
 Most field goals missed 1,562 by Wilt Chamberlain, 
 Most 2-point field goals made 1,597 by Wilt Chamberlain, 
 Highest 2-point field goal percentage 74.19 by Mitchell Robinson, 
 Most 2-point field goals attempted 3,159 by Wilt Chamberlain, 
 Most 2-point field goals missed 1,562 by Wilt Chamberlain, 

Free throws
 Most free throws made 840 by Jerry West, 
 Highest free throw percentage 98.05% by José Calderón, 
 Most free throws attempted 1,363 by Wilt Chamberlain, 

Rebounds
 Highest rebounds per game average 27.2 by Wilt Chamberlain, 
 Most rebounds 2,149 by Wilt Chamberlain, 

FoulsMost personal fouls 386 by Darryl Dawkins, 
 Most disqualifications 26 by Don Meineke, 
 Most consecutive disqualifications 6 by Don Boven, 

Individual career recordsMost seasons played 22 by Vince Carter
 Most seasons played in one team 21 by Dirk Nowitzki
 Most games played 1,611 by Robert Parish
 Most games played in one team 1,522 by Dirk Nowitzki
 Most minutes played 57,446 by Kareem Abdul-Jabbar
 Most minutes per game 45.8 by Wilt Chamberlain

PointsMost points 38,390 by LeBron James (active)
 Most consecutive seasons leading league in points 7 by Wilt Chamberlain (–)
 7 by Michael Jordan (–)
 Most 50+ point games 118 by Wilt Chamberlain
 Most 40+ point games 271 by Wilt Chamberlain
 Most consecutive 30+ point games 65 by Wilt Chamberlain from November 4,  – February 22, 
 Most consecutive 20+ point games 126 by Wilt Chamberlain from October 19,  – January 19, 
 Most consecutive 10+ point games 1,002 by LeBron James from January 6,  – present (active)

Field goals
 Most field goals made 15,837 by Kareem Abdul-Jabbar
 Most consecutive seasons leading league in field goals made 7 by Wilt Chamberlain (1960–66)
 7 by Michael Jordan (1987–93)
 Most consecutive seasons leading league in field goals attempted 7 by Wilt Chamberlain (1960–66)
 Most consecutive field goals made 35 by Wilt Chamberlain from February 17–28, 
 Most consecutive games with a field goal made 1,360 by Tim Duncan from October 31,  – December 30, .

Free throws
 Most free throws made 9,787 by Karl Malone
 Most free throws attempted 13,188 by Karl Malone
 Highest free throw percentage 90.90% by Stephen Curry (active)
 Most seasons leading league in free throws attempted 9 by Wilt Chamberlain
 Most seasons leading league in free throw percentage 7 by Bill Sharman

ReboundsMost rebounds 23,924 by Wilt Chamberlain
 Highest rebounds per game average 22.9 by Wilt Chamberlain
 Most seasons leading league in rebounds 11 by Wilt Chamberlain

AssistsMost assists 15,806 by John Stockton

StealsMost steals 3,265 by John Stockton

Blocked shotsMost blocks 3,830 by Hakeem Olajuwon

Other
 Most 3-point field goals made 3,302 by Stephen Curry (active)
 Most 3-point field goals attempted 7,723 by Stephen Curry (active)
 Highest 3-point field goal percentage 45.40% by Steve Kerr
 Most consecutive games with at least 1 steal 108 by Chris Paul
 Most disqualifications 127 by Vern Mikkelsen
 Most technical fouls by a player 304 by Rasheed Wallace

Rookie and age-related records
In 2006, the NBA introduced age requirement restrictions. Prospective high school players must wait a year before entering the NBA, making age-related records harder to break.Youngest player to be drafted Andrew Bynum was the youngest player to be drafted in NBA history at 17 years and 249 days after the Los Angeles Lakers selected him as the 10th overall pick in the 2005 NBA draft.Oldest player to be drafted Bernard James was the oldest player to be drafted in NBA history at 27 years and 148 days after the Cleveland Cavaliers selected him as the 33rd overall pick in the 2012 NBA draft before trading his rights to the Dallas Mavericks. He made his debut at 27 years and 266 days.Youngest player debut Andrew Bynum was the youngest player to debut in NBA history at 18 years and 6 days on his first game with the Los Angeles Lakers against the Denver Nuggets on November 2, .Oldest player debut Nat Hickey was the oldest player to debut in NBA history at 45 years and 362 days on his first game with the Providence Steamrollers against the St. Louis Bombers on January 27, . He was the team's coach and activated himself as a player. He only played 2 games.
 Most points per game by a rookie 37.6 by Wilt Chamberlain, 
 Most points in a game by a rookie 58 by Wilt Chamberlain, Philadelphia Warriors (vs. Detroit Pistons) on January 25, 
 58 by Wilt Chamberlain, Philadelphia Warriors (at New York Knicks) on February 21, 
 Most rebounds in a game by a rookie 45 by Wilt Chamberlain, Philadelphia Warriors (vs. Syracuse Nationals) on February 6, 
 Most assists in a game by a rookie 25 by Ernie DiGregorio, Buffalo Braves (at Portland Trail Blazers) on January 1, 
 25 by Nate McMillan, Seattle SuperSonics (vs. Los Angeles Clippers) on February 23, 
 Leading the league in scoring Youngest: Kevin Durant of the Oklahoma City Thunder, at 21 years, 197 days (on April 14), led the league in scoring by averaging 30.1 points per game during the  NBA season.
 Oldest: Michael Jordan of the Chicago Bulls, at 35 years, 60 days (on April 18), led the league in scoring by averaging 28.7 points per game during the  NBA season.
 Leading the league in rebounding Youngest: Dwight Howard of the Orlando Magic, at 22 years, 130 days (on April 16), led the league in rebounding by averaging 14.2 rebounds per game during the  NBA season.
 Youngest/Oldest player to score 60+ points in a game Youngest: Devin Booker is the youngest player to score 60+ points in a game, scoring 70 points for the Phoenix Suns vs. the Boston Celtics at the age of 20 years, 145 days.
 Oldest: Kobe Bryant is the oldest player to score 60+ points in a game, scoring 60 points for the Los Angeles Lakers vs. the Utah Jazz at the age of 37 years, 234 days.
 Youngest/Oldest player to score 50+ points in a game Youngest: Brandon Jennings is the youngest player to score 50+ points in a game, scoring 55 points for the Milwaukee Bucks against the Golden State Warriors at the age of 20 years, 52 days.
 Oldest: Jamal Crawford is the oldest player to score 50+ points in a game, scoring 51 points for the Phoenix Suns against the Dallas Mavericks at the age of 39 years, 21 days.
 Youngest/Oldest player to score 40+ points in a game Oldest: Michael Jordan is the oldest player and only 40-year-old player to score 40+ points in a game, doing so with 43 points for the Washington Wizards vs. the New Jersey Nets at the age of 40 years, 4 days.
 Youngest/Oldest player to score 30+ points in a game Oldest: Dirk Nowitzki is the oldest player to score 30+ points in a game, doing so with 30 points for the Dallas Mavericks vs. the Phoenix Suns at the age of 40 years, 294 days.
 Youngest/Oldest player to score 20+ points in a game Oldest: Vince Carter is the oldest player to score 20+ points in a game, doing so with 21 points for the Atlanta Hawks vs. the Miami Heat at the age of 42 years, 37 days.
 Youngest/Oldest player to score 20+ points in a game as a reserve Oldest: Vince Carter is the oldest player to score 20+ while coming off the bench, he scored 21 points for the Atlanta Hawks against the Miami Heat at the age of 42 years, 37 days.Youngest/Oldest player to record a triple-double Youngest: Josh Giddey at the age of 19 years, 84 days (on January 2)
 Oldest: Karl Malone at the age of 40 years, 127 days (November 28)
 Youngest player to reach... (career) 5,000 Points – LeBron James (21 years, 22 days) on January 21, 
 10,000 Points – LeBron James (23 years, 59 days) on February 27, 
 20,000 Points – LeBron James (28 years, 17 days) on January 16, 
 25,000 Points – LeBron James (30 years, 307 days) on November 2, 
 30,000 Points – LeBron James (33 years, 24 days) on January 23, 
 35,000 Points – LeBron James (36 years, 50 days) on February 18, 
 5,000 Rebounds – Dwight Howard (23 years, 112 days) on March 30, 
 10,000 Rebounds – Wilt Chamberlain (28 years, 81 days) on November 10, 
 1,000 Assists – LeBron James (20 years, 102 days) on April 11, 
 1,000 Blocks – Josh Smith (24 years, 59 days) on February 2, 
 500 3-Point Field Goals – Devin Booker (22 years, 127 days) on March 6, 
 1,000 3-Point Field Goals – Jayson Tatum (24 years, 344 days) on February 11, 
 3,000 3-Point Field Goals – Stephen Curry (33 years, 289 days) on December 28, 

Team game recordsNote: Other than the longest game and disqualifications in a game, all records in this section are since the 24-second shot clock was instituted for  season onward.''
 Longest game The longest NBA game occurred on January 6,  between the Olympians and Royals. Indianapolis beat Rochester 75–73 after 6 overtimes.Most points in a game – overtime 186 by the Detroit Pistons vs. the Denver Nuggets on December 13,  (3 OT)
 Most points in a game – regulation 173 by the Boston Celtics vs. the Minneapolis Lakers on February 27, 
 173 by the Phoenix Suns vs. the Denver Nuggets on November 10, 
 Fewest points in a game (post-shot clock) 49 by the Chicago Bulls vs. the Miami Heat on April 10, 
 Most points in 1st half 107 by the Phoenix Suns vs. the Denver Nuggets on November 10, 
 Most points in 2nd half 97 by the Atlanta Hawks at the San Diego Rockets on February 11, 
 Fewest points in 1st half 19 by the Los Angeles Clippers at the Los Angeles Lakers on December 14, 
 Fewest points in 2nd half 16 by the New Orleans Hornets at the Los Angeles Clippers on March 1, espn.com, Clippers hold Hornets to NBA-low 16 points in second half, accessed August 12, 2007.
 Fewest field goals made in a game 16 by the Orlando Magic vs. the Boston Celtics on January 23, 
 Most combined 3-point field goals made in a game 43 – The Golden State Warriors (24) vs. the New Orleans Pelicans (19) on January 16, 
 Most 3-point field goals attempted in a game 70 by the Houston Rockets vs. the Brooklyn Nets on January 16, 
 Most 3-point field goals attempted in a game, none made 22 by the Denver Nuggets vs. Portland Trail Blazers, December 21, 
 Most combined 3-point field goals attempted in a game 106 – The Houston Rockets (70) vs. the Brooklyn Nets (36) on January 16, 
 Most 3-point field goals made in a game 29 by the Milwaukee Bucks vs. the Miami Heat on December 29, 
 Most 3-point field goals made in a half 18 by the Utah Jazz vs. the Orlando Magic on April 3, 
 Most 3-point field goals attempted in a half 35 by the Houston Rockets vs. the Brooklyn Nets on January 16, 
 Only team to double its opponents' score in a game The Indiana Pacers defeated the Portland Trail Blazers 124–59 on February 27, 
 Largest margin of victory 73 – The Memphis Grizzlies defeated the Oklahoma City Thunder 152–79 on December 2, 
 Largest margin of scoring in a half 50 – The Dallas Mavericks outscored the Los Angeles Clippers 77–27 in the 1st half on December 27, 
 Largest margin of scoring in a quarter 36 – The Los Angeles Lakers outscored the Sacramento Kings 40–4 in the 1st quarter on February 4, 
 Most rebounds in a game 109 by the Boston Celtics vs. the Detroit Pistons on December 24, 
 Fewest rebounds in a game 17 by the Brooklyn Nets vs. the Oklahoma City Thunder on January 31, 
 Most assists in a game53 by the Milwaukee Bucks vs. the Detroit Pistons on December 26, 
 Most assists in a half33 by the Phoenix Suns vs. the Denver Nuggets on November 10, 
 Fewest assists in a game 3 by the Boston Celtics vs. the Minneapolis Lakers on November 28, 
 3 by the Baltimore Bullets vs. the Boston Celtics on October 16, 
 3 by the Cincinnati Royals vs. the Chicago Bulls on December 5, 
 3 by the New York Knicks vs. the Boston Celtics on March 28, 
 Most steals in a quarter 12 by the Golden State Warriors vs. the Indiana Pacers on January 16, 
 Fewest turnovers in a game 1 by the Denver Nuggets vs. the Portland Trail Blazers on Feb 23, 2021
 Most fast-break points in a game 56 by the Phoenix Suns at the Golden State Warriors on March 15, 
 Largest comebacks 36 points (:20 left in 2nd) – The Utah Jazz overcame a 36-point deficit to defeat the Denver Nuggets at home on November 27, . Utah trailed 70–34 with 20 seconds left in the 1st half, but outscored Denver 73–33 during the rest of the game to win 107–103. This is the largest overall deficit overcome in NBA history.

Team season records
 Best record 73–9 (.890) by the Golden State Warriors in the  season
 Worst record 7–59 (.106) by the Charlotte Bobcats in the  season
 Most losses 73 by the Philadelphia 76ers in the  season
 Fewest wins 6 by the Providence Steamrollers in the  season
 Longest winning streak 33 by the Los Angeles Lakers from November 5,  – January 7, 
 Best home record 40–1 (.976) by the Boston Celtics in the  season
 40–1 (.976) by the San Antonio Spurs in the  season
 Fewest home losses 1 by the Washington Capitols in the  season
 1 by the Minneapolis Lakers, Syracuse Nationals, and Rochester Royals in the  season
 1 by the Boston Celtics in the  season
 1 by the San Antonio Spurs in the  season
 Worst home record 2–18 (.121) by the Providence Steamrollers in the  season
 Fewest home wins 2 by the Providence Steamrollers in the  season
 Most home losses 35 by the Dallas Mavericks in the  season
 Best road record 34–7 (.829) by the Golden State Warriors in the  season
 Most road wins 34 by the Golden State Warriors in the  season
 Fewest road losses 6 by the Los Angeles Lakers in the  season	
 Worst road record 0–20 (.000) by the Baltimore Bullets in the  season
 Fewest home wins 0 by the Baltimore Bullets in the  season
 Most road losses 40 by the Sacramento Kings in the  season
 Lowest average point differential -15.2 by the Dallas Mavericks in the  season
 Best single-season improvement The Boston Celtics improved from 24 wins in the  season to 66 in the  season.

Team franchise records
 Highest winning percentage 61.8% by the San Antonio Spurs (2,189–1,352)
 Lowest winning percentage 39.6% by the Minnesota Timberwolves (980–1,496)
 Longest streak of at least one 3-point field goal made 1,287 games: Phoenix Suns (March 29, –Present)

Other records
 Most consecutive points in a regular season game 26 by Carmelo Anthony, Denver Nuggets (vs. Minnesota Timberwolves), December 10, 
 Largest attendance at a game  68,323 on January 13, Golden State Warriors at the San Antonio Spurs in the Alamodome. This was a part of the 50th season of Spurs franchise in San Antonio.
 20/20/20s (20+ in any 3 stats)
 Wilt Chamberlain had 22 points, 25 rebounds, and 21 assists on February 4, 
 Russell Westbrook had 20 points, 20 rebounds, and 21 assists on April 2, 
 Only player to record a 20-20 on a 5x5 (20+ in any 2 stats and at least 5 on the remaining 3 stats)
 Jusuf Nurkic recorded 24 points, 23 rebounds, 7 assists, 5 steals and 5 blocks on January 1, .
 Only players to lead the league in blocks and rebounding in the same season Dwight Howard (Orlando Magic)Howard wins Kia Defensive Player of the Year Award again , nba.com, April 20, 2010, accessed April 23, 2013.
 Most Franchises Played For'
 13 by Ish Smith (Houston Rockets ), (Memphis Grizzlies ), (Golden State Warriors ), (Orlando Magic –), (Milwaukee Bucks ), (Phoenix Suns ), (Oklahoma City Thunder ), (Philadelphia 76ers), (New Orleans Pelicans ), (Detroit Pistons –), (Washington Wizards –), (Charlotte Hornets ) & (Denver Nuggets )

 Most teams played for in an NBA season
 5 by Bobby Jones (Denver Nuggets, Memphis Grizzlies, Houston Rockets, Miami Heat, San Antonio Spurs)

See also
 Basketball statistics
 List of National Basketball Association career scoring leaders
 List of National Basketball Association career 3-point scoring leaders
 List of National Basketball Association career rebounding leaders
 List of National Basketball Association career assists leaders
 List of National Basketball Association career steals leaders
 List of National Basketball Association career blocks leaders
 List of National Basketball Association top rookie scoring averages
 List of National Basketball Association single-season scoring leaders
 List of National Basketball Association single-season rebounding leaders
 List of National Basketball Association single-game scoring leaders
 List of National Basketball Association single-game rebounding leaders
 List of National Basketball Association players with most assists in a game
 List of National Basketball Association players with most steals in a game
 List of National Basketball Association players with most blocks in a game
 List of National Basketball Association longest winning streaks
 List of National Basketball Association longest losing streaks
 List of NBA teams by single season win percentage
 List of oldest and youngest National Basketball Association players
 NBA post-season records

Footnotes

References
 NBA.com
 Basketball Reference
 Playoffs record from USA Today
 Finals record from USA Today

National Basketball Association lists